Erin Routliffe and Aldila Sutjiadi were the defending champions, but both players chose not to participate.

Tímea Babos and Nao Hibino won the title, defeating Olga Govortsova and Katarzyna Kawa in the final, 6–4, 3–6, [10–7].

Seeds

Draw

Draw

References
Main Draw

FineMark Women's Pro Tennis Championship - Doubles